Antidotes is the debut studio album by British indie rock band Foals.  It was released on 24 March 2008 in the United Kingdom on Transgressive Records, and on 8 April 2008 in the United States through Sub Pop.

The album's themes are varied and cryptic, but are generally melancholic and focused on relationships. They are exemplified by the four singles: "Balloons", "Cassius", "Red Socks Pugie", and "Olympic Airways".

Recording
The album was recorded in Stay Gold Studios Brooklyn in summer 2007, and was produced by TV on the Radio's Dave Sitek. However, Foals remixed Antidotes in London, complaining that he made it sound like it was "recorded in the Grand Canyon."

However, in an interview with MusFlashTV, Foals' drummer Jack Bevan said, "Our producer, David Sitek was great because he didn't interfere in the actual recording progress. We kind of engineered it so that we would get the tracks down, get all of the sort of essential parts down and then, halfway through the recording he kind of came in, and when we were doing overdubs and that kind of thing, he sort of started to assist us with making it sort of fill out." Yannis added "All the sounds were there, and he added a depth. He messed with the spaces around the sounds so there's this weird ambience on all the tracks."

The tracking of the parts was unorthodox in many ways ranging from drums recorded in alleyways on cassette tape recorders and then reprocessed through outboard gear to vocals being sung while moving round the room and brass performed by members of Antibalas Afrobeat Orchestra directed to not play directly into the microphones.

Reception

It peaked at number three in the UK Albums Chart. In the US, it reached a high of number 28 in Top Heatseekers, but failed to chart in the Billboard Top 200.

According to Metacritic, the album received "generally favourable reviews" from critics.

Track listing

Chart positions

Personnel
 Foals
Yannis Philippakis – vocals, guitar, drums
Jack Bevan – drums
Jimmy Smith – guitar
Walter Gervers – bass, backing vocals
Edwin Congreave – keyboard, backing vocals

 Additional musicians
Stuart Bogie – saxophone
Aaron Johnson – trombone
Eric Biondo – trumpet

 Technical personnel
Tinhead – artwork
Alan Labiner – engineering
Chris Coady – engineering
John Valencia – engineering
Guy Davie – mastering
Mike Crossey – mixing
David Andrew Sitek – producer
L. Hris Moore – recording assistant

References

2008 debut albums
Foals (band) albums
Sub Pop albums
Transgressive Records albums
Albums produced by Dave Sitek